Christin Lilja (born 7 January 1975) is a Swedish former footballer. She was a member of the Sweden national team that reached the semi finals of UEFA Women's Euro 1997.

Lilja played club football for Lotorps IF in the Damallsvenskan before joining clubs in Norway.

After she retired from playing football, Lilja became a coach. She is an assistant manager with IFK Norrköping DFK.

References

Living people
1975 births
Swedish women's footballers
Damallsvenskan players
Sweden women's international footballers
Women's association football midfielders
Toppserien players
Athene Moss players
Swedish expatriate sportspeople in Norway
Expatriate footballers in Norway